Saunders Lake is an unincorporated community and census-designated place (CDP) in Coos County, Oregon, United States. It was first listed as a CDP prior to the 2020 census.

Saunders Lake, a small water body, is in the northern part of the CDP, draining north through Clear Lake to Saunders Creek, which flows north to Tenmile Creek between Lakeside and the Pacific Ocean. 

The Saunders Lake CDP is bordered to the west by the Oregon Dunes National Recreation Area.

Demographics

References 

Census-designated places in Coos County, Oregon
Census-designated places in Oregon